Helen Lindes Griffiths (born 17 August 1981) is a Spanish actress and model who was awarded Miss Spain 2000 and placed 2nd Runner-up to Lara Dutta of India in the Miss Universe 2000 contest.

Sources
Lindes bio page
article on Lindes

External links

1981 births
Living people
Miss Spain winners
Miss Universe 2000 contestants
Spanish beauty pageant winners
Spanish female models
Spanish people of Scottish descent